Eugene Robert Black Sr. (May 1, 1898 – February 20, 1992) was an American banker who was President of the World Bank from 1949 to 1963. His father, a 1930s Chairman of the Federal Reserve, also named Eugene Robert Black, did not use the "Sr." suffix; Gene's son (the third in line) became Eugene Robert Black Jr.

Life and career 

Black was born in Atlanta, Georgia, in 1898. He attended the University of Georgia where he was a member of the Chi Phi Fraternity and the Phi Kappa Literary Society. Upon graduating with an A.B. in 1917, enlisted in the United States Navy. During World War I he was assigned to convoy duty in the North Atlantic.

Upon leaving the Navy after the War, he joined the investment firm of Harris, Forbes, & Co. He worked as a traveling salesperson for the firm selling bonds and meeting with bankers and investors. He opened the firm's first southern office in Atlanta and later became a partner in the firm.

In 1933, he was hired by the Chase National Bank to be their vice-president. He went on to become the senior vice-president of Chase National's investment portfolio.

He became the executive director of the World Bank in 1947. When the Bank's President, John J. McCloy, resigned in 1949, Black, against his will, became the President of the Bank.

While not joining in the anti-communist fervor following World War II, Black was concerned about the spread of communism and its impact on the spread of global capitalism. He believed the economic prosperity was an essential prerequisite for political freedom. Black had wanted to return to work for Chase National but his personal commitment to the objectives of the World Bank overrode that desire and he remained as the President of the Bank.

At the time of his departure from the World Bank, he had been President for 13 of its 16 years of existence, and the force of his personality, and connection with every employee, led to it being known as, "Black's Bank".

In 1963, the United States was considering pursuing a program to create a supersonic transport (SST) to rival the British and French Concorde. President Kennedy commissioned an outside review of the feasibility of a federally funded SST program. The commission was headed by Black and Stanley Osborne, chairman of Olin Mathieson Chemical Corporation. The review was completed in December 1963 and was given to President Lyndon B. Johnson. The report recommended not pursuing a race against the Concorde and instead the effort should focus initially on building a test aircraft for research.

From 1962 to 1968, Black was chairman of the Brookings Institution.

President Johnson selected Black in 1966 to be Special Adviser to the President on Southeast Asian Social and Economic Development. In this position, Black was charged with organizing and establishing the Asian Development Bank. This was a task which Black was initially quite hesitant to undertake, but Johnson would not take no for an answer. To President Johnson, the creation of the ADB was an important step in securing Asian support or at least acquiescence for the War in Vietnam.

Black also served on a number of boards for corporations and foundations. The University of Georgia Foundation named a fellowship in honor of him and his achievements. Princeton University awarded him an honorary Doctor of Laws degree in 1960. Black was Chair of the Peabody Awards Board of Jurors from 1967 to 1977.

References

External links 

 

1898 births
1992 deaths
American bankers
Businesspeople from Atlanta
Presidents of the World Bank Group
United States Navy sailors
University of Georgia alumni
20th-century American businesspeople